The  ESG Grunau 9, later known as the ESG 29 and post-1933 as the DFS 108-10, was one of the first primary gliders, built in Germany from the late 1920s.  It was widely sold.

Design and development
The Grunau 9 was a German single seat trainer glider, one of the first of a group that later became known as primary gliders.  It was developed by Edmund Schneider from Alexander Lippisch's Djävlar Anamma via the Espenlaub primary. The Grunau 9 was produced in numbers and was sold widely.

The downward sloping extremities of these beams carried a slightly deeper horizontal box structure below the cross beam, with the open pilot's seat and controls upon it. On some later aircraft there was an extra vertical member for the lower cross beam to the wing root to provide the pilot with a backrest. Others enclosed him or her in a simple, light, short nacelle between the nose and the backrest strut. The rear part of the fuselage frame was based on two longer beams reaching to the tail. The upper one was horizontal and attached to both converging A-frame beams, near but not at its apex. The lower one sloped upwards and was attached to the rear sloping part of the A-frame just below the cross-member. These two rear fuselage beams were cross braced with three more struts, one vertical about halfway to the tail, forming two bays which were crossed diagonally by the other two struts. There was another, short vertical strut in the rear bay between the upper and diagonal members. For landings a skid ran between three projecting ends of the forward and lower A-frame.

The Grunau 9 had almost rectangular, two spar, wooden structured, two piece wings with fabric covering everywhere except the leading edges, which were plywood covered. Short, simple rectangular, cropped ailerons reached to the square wing tips. They were attached to the upper fuselage beam with their leading edges at the forward sloping member and a chordwise gap between their roots. There were also bracing wires from the wing rear spars to the tail to retrain its lateral movement. The vertical rudder hinge was at the end of the fuselage, with a rudder that was rectangular apart from its sloping lower edge. A triangular tailplane was mounted on the upper, horizontal fuselage beam with the elevator hinge in line with the rudder's. The rectangular elevators therefore required a cut-out for rudder movement; like the rudder and tailplane, the elevators were fabric covered. A fin was provided by fabric covering the near triangular area of the rear fuselage between the rudder hinge, the upper and lower beams and the diagonal between them.

The Grunau 9 first flew in 1928.  The following year, Schneider made changes to the tail and introduced a new and (it turned out) temporary naming convention involving the year, redesignating it as the ESG 29, though it was not a unique name.   After its formation in 1933, the Deutsche Forschungsanstalt für Segelflug (DFS) gave it the type number DFS 108-10. The positioning of a wooden strut immediately in front of the pilot's head led to the type being nicknamed the Schädelspalter, or skullsplitter. Large numbers were built and sold widely over several years. At least one Dutch registered Grunau 9 remained active after World War II.

Aircraft on display
From:Aviatiom Museums and Collections of Mainland Europe (2009)
Finnish Aviation Museum, Helsinki: G-36
Icelandic Aviation Museum, Akureyri: Grunau IX "Valur". Built 1938, still airworthy but last flown June 2004.
Norwegian Aviation Museum, Bodø: Grunau 9 LN-GAH
Segelflyg Museum, Falköping:SE-27

These are original Grunau 9s.  Other museums worldwide have originals not on public display, others have reproductions.

Specifications (1930 model)

See also
Hanna Reitsch

References

1920s German sailplanes
Glider aircraft
Aircraft first flown in 1928
Edmund Schneider aircraft